Bruce Murray is an American sports radio personality and the host of a daily radio show on SiriusXM's NFL Radio. Murray is the host of the "SiriusXM Blitz", heard Monday through Friday from 11AM - 3PM eastern time. Murray can also be heard hosting "Time to let it fly with Murray and Lye", on the SiriusXM PGA Channel with former touring pro, Mark Lye. He has been with SiriusXM and its predecessor, Sirius Satellite Radio, since 2006, when he began as co-host of The Mike and Murray Show (he began in the summer of 2006); he would also host the Red Zone on Sirius NFL Radio."

Background
Born in 1963, Murray is a 1981 graduate of Hewlett High School and in 2004, he was inducted into their Hall of Fame He attended Tulane University, where he "was the voice of the Green Wave's basketball and football teams from 1983–1985."

Bruce has three sons, Jack, Max, and Lucas with his wife Hilary.

Murray began his career as a producer and weekend sports anchor at the nation's first all sports radio station, WFAN. He moved on to become a line producer at the now defunct Mizlou Sports News Network." He's also worked at ESPN Radio and at Washington, D.C.'s sports radio station WTEM where he hosted the Washington Bullets pre, post and Coaches show.

Murray joined Sporting News Radio in the 1990s. From 2002 to 2005, Murray hosted Sporting News Radio's morning show Murray in the Morning, a hot talk-oriented morning zoo that departed heavily from the network's usual sports talk format.  He also co-hosted The Troy Aikman Show, The Bill Parcells Show and Around the NFL.

In 2009, Murray was one of the original on-air personalities when SiriusXM's Mad Dog Radio channel was launched. On March 8, 2012, he joined with best-selling author and columnist John Feinstein for the sports talk show, Beyond the Brink before the departure of Feinstein to CBS. In March 2013, Murray announced his departure from Mad Dog Radio, and moved over to the NFL Channel on SiriusXM, co-hosting The SiriusXM Blitz with former quarterback Rich Gannon.

References

External links
Murray in the Morning Show

American sports radio personalities
Sirius XM Radio programs
George W. Hewlett High School alumni
Tulane University alumni
People from The Five Towns, New York
20th-century American Jews
1963 births
Living people
21st-century American Jews